Piper may refer to:

People 
 Piper (given name)
 Piper (surname)

Arts and entertainment

Fictional characters

Comics 
 Piper (Morlock), in the Marvel Universe
 Piper (Mutate), in the Marvel Universe

Television 
 Piper Chapman, lead character in the American comedy-drama series Orange Is the New Black
 Piper Halliwell, one of the lead characters on Charmed
 Piper Hart, Henry Hart's little sister in the Nickelodeon series Henry Danger
 Piper Willis, in the Australian soap opera Neighbours
 Piper Willowbrook, an elf in the Nickelodeon series Mysticons
 Mr. Piper, host on the 1960s Canadian television show of the same name
 Piper, an artificial intelligence in Emergence
 Piper, a tactical expert in Storm Hawks

Other 
 Piper McLean, a daughter of Aphrodite and one of the seven in Rick Riordan's The Heroes of Olympus
 Piper Pinwheeler, a character in the 2005 animated film Robots
 The Piper, a character in The Keys to the Kingdom book series
 Piper, in the video game Mario & Luigi: Superstar Saga
 Piper, a character in a sidequest in the video game  Paper Mario: Color Splash
 Piper Wright, a reporter in the video game Fallout 4
Piper Willowbrook, main character of Mysticons in which she is the legendary Mysticon Striker.

Films 
 The Piper (film), a 2015 South Korean mystery film
 Piper (film), a 2016 Pixar short film

Music 
 Piper, a 1970s rock band fronted by Billy Squier
 "Piper" from the 1985 P-Model Karkador album
 "Piper", from the 2000 Phish Farmhouse album
 "The Piper" (song), from the 1980 ABBA Super Trouper album

Video games
 Piper (video game), a 1995 interactive movie video game
 Piper de la Prim, a noblewoman with good manners and a playable character in the mobile game Brawl Stars
 Piper, a character from Bendy and the Ink Machine. He, along with the other members of the Butcher Gang, Striker and Fisher, are recurring enemies. He is a twisted version of the cartoon character Charley.

Biology 
 Piper (plant), a plant genus
 Piper gurnard (Trigla lyra), a species of fish that makes a distinctive sound when taken out of the water
 Piper, Hyporhamphus ihi, a species of fish with a long lower jaw
 Eurytela, a genus of butterflies known as pipers

 Piper diagram, for water chemistry data

Places 
 Piper, Iowa, an unincorporated community in the United States
 Piper, Kansas, a neighborhood in Kansas City, Kansas, United States
 Piper, Missouri, an unincorporated community in the United States
 Piper Peak (Nevada), a mountain
 Piper Pass, a pass on Ellesmere Island, Nunavut, Canada
 Piper oilfield, in the North Sea
 Piperville, rural community in eastern Ontario, Canada

Transportation 
 Piper Aircraft, an American manufacturer of general aviation aircraft
 Piper Cars, a former British maker of sports cars
 Piper Race Cars, an American racecar constructor
 ST Piper, a tugboat

Other uses 
 , a US Navy submarine which served in World War II
 ETA10-P or "Piper", a model of the ETA10 supercomputer
 Piper High School (Florida)
 Piper High School (Kansas)

See also 
 Piper-Heidsieck, champagne producer
 Pipers (disambiguation)
 Pyper, a list of people with the surname or given name